USS Valiant has been the name of more than one United States Navy ship, and may refer to:

 , a patrol vessel in commission from 1917 to 1919
 , ex-USS PC-509, a submarine chaser, later coastal patrol yacht, in commission from 1941 to 1944
 , a 
 titular ship of the Star Trek: Deep Space Nine episode Valiant

Other
 , United States Coast Guard medium endurance cutter

See also
 
 Valiant (disambiguation)

United States Navy ship names